Sandra Lanthaler (born 1 February 1984) is an Italian luger who has competed since the late 1990s. A natural track luger, she won the gold medal in the women's singles event at the 2002 FIL European Luge Natural Track Championships in Frantschach, Austria.

References
FIL-Luge profile: Lanthaler, Sandra
Natural track European Championships results 1970-2006.

1984 births
Living people
Italian lugers
Italian female lugers
Sportspeople from Südtirol